The Madonna of the Quail (Italian: Madonna della Quaglia) is an International Gothic painting generally attributed to Pisanello. Dating to c. 1420, it was housed in the Castelvecchio Museum of Verona, northern Italy until stolen in 2015. It would be recovered in 2016.

Description
The painting depicts the Madonna with Child crowned by two flying angels, sitting inside a rose garden in typical late Gothic style. The painter put a great attention in the representation of vegetables and birds, including the quail in the foreground, which gives its name to the painting. The heavenly appearance of the scene is enhanced by the gilt background.

The rendering of the Madonna and her clothes resemble those of the works by Gentile da Fabriano, whose workshop   Pisanello was a member of at the time. The setting is also similar to the contemporary Madonna of the Rose Garden by Michelino da Besozzo or Stefano da Verona, also in the museum of Castelvecchio.

References

Sources

Paintings by Pisanello
1420s paintings
Gothic paintings
Nude art
Birds in art
Paintings of the Madonna and Child
Stolen works of art
Paintings in the collection of the Castelvecchio Museum
Angels in art